Reginald Phillips may refer to:

 Reginald Phillips (cricketer) (1897–1963), Welsh cricketer
 Reginald H. Phillips, member of the Illinois House of Representatives
 Reginald M. Phillips (1888–1977), English businessman, philanthropist and philatelist
Reg Phillips (footballer, born 1900) ( – 1924), English football full back (Brighton & Hove Albion) 
Reg Phillips (footballer, born 1921) (1921–1972), Welsh football forward (Crewe Alexandra)
 Reggie Phillips (Reginald Keith Phillips, born 1960), American football cornerback